A Constellation of Vital Phenomena is a novel written by Anthony Marra, published May 7, 2013 by Random House. The book was a New York Times best seller and received positive critical review. The work has also been referenced in academic journals, including War, Literature & the Arts and The Lancet.

Reception
A Constellation of Vital Phenomena starred reviews from Library Journal, Publishers Weekly, and Booklist, as well as received positive reviews from The New York Times Book Review, World Literature Today, Kirkus Reviews, Chicago Tribune, The Washington Post, NPR, San Francisco Chronicle, Shelf Awareness, The Economist, and Entertainment Weekly. The New York Times and The Boston Globe provided a mixed review.

Accolades

References

2013 American novels
Random House books